Gaddiannaram is a suburb in Hyderabad, India. It is located close to the major commercial center, Dilsukhnagar.

Transport 
Gaddiannaram has a major bus depot owned by TSRTC, and is therefore well connected to all parts of the city.

The closest MMTS train station is at Malakpet.

References 

Neighbourhoods in Hyderabad, India